Shan Mohammed is an Indian film editor who has worked on Hindi, Telugu, and Tamil-language films.

Career
A commerce graduate, Shan Mohammed, had gone to Chennai for his articleship and became acquainted with cinematographer P. C. Sreeram at a photo exhibition, who recommended that he go to Mumbai, if he wanted a pursue a career in films. Soon Shan was working with Pankaj Advani on a series of 10-minute films titled Bheja Fry for Channel V, and then in 2000, he got into Pune’s Film and Television Institute of India in the editing course. During his course, Shan actively sought out opportunities to become involved in Hindi cinema, and went on to edit the experimental films, The Great Indian Butterfly (2007) and Frozen (2007) during his third year. His work in both ventures were well appreciated and he subsequently moved on to bigger projects, and won further acclaim for his work in Aamir Khan's production Jaane Tu... Ya Jaane Na (2008). He subsequently became acquainted with Kamal Haasan and was signed to work on the big-budget, bilingual period film, Marmayogi, before it was shelved.

He continued to win acclaim for his work in Wake Up Sid (2009) and Lekar Hum Deewana Dil (2014), while he returned to collaborate with Kamal Haasan on Tamil and Telugu films. In 2014, he exited midway through the production of Revolver Rani (2014) claiming that the producers failed to pay him for his work.

Filmography

As editor

 The Great Indian Butterfly (2007)
 Frozen (2007)
 Jaane Tu... Ya Jaane Na (2008)
 Ek Tho Chance (2009)
 Wake Up Sid (2009)
 Harud (2010)
 Jhootha Hi Sahi (2010)
 Manmadan Ambu (2010)
 My Friend Pinto (2011)
 Zinda Bhaag (2013)
 One by Two (2014)
 Lekar Hum Deewana Dil (2014)
 Fireflies (2014)
 Hawaizaada (2015)
 Thoongaa Vanam (2015)
 Cheekati Rajyam (2015)
 Gurgaon (2017)
 Lakhon Mein Ek (2017)
 Rammat Gammat (2018)
 Kaalakaandi (2018)
 Dostana 2 (2020)

References

External links
 

Living people
Hindi film editors
Tamil film editors
Film and Television Institute of India alumni
Telugu film editors
Year of birth missing (living people)